The 92nd New York State Legislature, consisting of the New York State Senate and the New York State Assembly, met from January 5 to May 11, 1869, during the first year of John T. Hoffman's governorship, in Albany.

Background
Under the provisions of the New York Constitution of 1846, 32 Senators and 128 assemblymen were elected in single-seat districts; senators for a two-year term, assemblymen for a one-year term. The senatorial districts were made up of entire counties, except New York County (five districts) and Kings County (two districts). The Assembly districts were made up of entire towns, or city wards, forming a contiguous area, all within the same county.

According to the Constitution of 1846, twenty years after its elaboration the electorate was asked if they wanted a Constitutional Convention to be held, which was answered at the 1866 New York state election, in the affirmative. On April 23, 1867, the delegates to the Constitutional Convention were elected, resulting in a Republican majority. On June 4, the Constitutional Convention met at Albany; adjourned on September 23; and met again on November 12. On February 28, 1868, the Constitutional Convention adjourned sine die. How to put the proposed amendments before the electorate was then debated throughout the 91st and the 92nd Legislature, and all amendments, except the re-organization of the judicial system, were eventually rejected by the voters at the New York state election, 1869.

At this time there were two major political parties: the Republican Party and the Democratic Party.

Elections
The 1868 New York state election was held on November 3. Mayor of New York City John T. Hoffman and Allen C. Beach (both Democrats) were elected Governor and Lieutenant Governor. The other three statewide elective offices up for election were also carried by the Democrats. The approximate party strength at this election, as expressed by the vote for Governor, was: Democrats 439,000 and Republicans 411,000.

Sessions
The Legislature met for the regular session at the Old State Capitol in Albany on January 5, 1869; and adjourned on May 11.

Truman G. Younglove (R) was elected Speaker with 71 votes against 52 for William Hitchman (D).

On January 19, the Legislature elected Ex-Governor Reuben E. Fenton (R) to succeed Edwin D. Morgan as U.S. Senator from New York for a six-year term beginning on March 4, 1869.

On February 4, Charles J. Folger (R) was elected president pro tempore of the State Senate "for this session."

On February 24, Richard Crowley (R) was elected president pro tempore of the State Senate "for this day."

On April 29, the Legislature elected Henry Smith (R) as a Metropolitan Police Commissioner, to fill the vacancy caused by the resignation of Thomas C. Acton.

State Senate

Districts

 1st District: Queens, Richmond and Suffolk counties
 2nd District: 1st, 2nd, 3rd, 4th, 5th, 7th, 11th, 13th, 15th, 19th and 20th wards of the City of Brooklyn
 3rd District: 6th, 8th, 9th, 10th, 12th, 14th, 16th, 17th and 18th wards of the City of Brooklyn; and all towns in Kings County
 4th District: 1st, 2nd, 3rd, 4th, 5th, 6th, 7th, 13th and 14th wards of New York City
 5th District: 8th, 9th, 15th and 16th wards of New York City
 6th District: 10th, 11th and 17th wards of New York City
 7th District: 18th, 20th and 21st wards of New York City
 8th District: 12th, 19th and 22nd wards of New York City
 9th District: Putnam, Rockland and Westchester counties
 10th District: Orange and Sullivan counties
 11th District: Columbia and Dutchess counties
 12th District: Rensselaer and Washington counties
 13th District: Albany County
 14th District: Greene and Ulster counties
 15th District: Fulton, Hamilton, Montgomery, Saratoga and Schenectady counties
 16th District: Clinton, Essex and Warren counties
 17th District: Franklin and St. Lawrence counties
 18th District: Jefferson and Lewis counties
 19th District: Oneida County
 20th District: Herkimer and Otsego counties
 21st District: Madison and Oswego counties
 22nd District: Onondaga and Cortland counties
 23rd District: Chenango, Delaware and Schoharie counties
 24th District: Broome, Tompkins and Tioga counties
 25th District: Cayuga and Wayne counties
 26th District: Ontario, Seneca and Yates counties
 27th District: Chemung, Schuyler and Steuben counties
 28th District: Monroe County
 29th District: Genesee, Niagara and Orleans counties
 30th District: Allegany, Livingston and Wyoming counties
 31st District: Erie County
 32nd District: Cattaraugus and Chautauqua counties

Note: There are now 62 counties in the State of New York. The counties which are not mentioned in this list had not yet been established, or sufficiently organized, the area being included in one or more of the abovementioned counties.

Members
The asterisk (*) denotes members of the previous Legislature who continued in office as members of this Legislature.

Employees
 Clerk: James Terwilliger
 Sergeant-at-Arms: John H. Kemper
 Assistant Sergeant-at-Arms: George H. Knapp
 Doorkeeper: Charles V. Schram
 Assistant Doorkeeper: Nathaniel Saxton
 Assistant Doorkeeper: David L. Shields
 Assistant Doorkeeper: Elisha T. Burdick

State Assembly

Assemblymen
The asterisk (*) denotes members of the previous Legislature who continued as members of this Legislature.

Party affiliations follow the vote for Speaker.

Employees
 Clerk:  Edward F. Underhill
 Sergeant-at-Arms: Samuel C. Pierce
 Doorkeeper: John Hancock
 First Assistant Doorkeeper: Franklin Hutchinson
 Second Assistant Doorkeeper: James Tanner
 Stenographer: Hudson C. Tanner

Notes

Sources
 The New York Civil List compiled by Franklin Benjamin Hough, Stephen C. Hutchins and Edgar Albert Werner (1870; see pg. 439 for Senate districts; pg. 444 for senators; pg. 450–463 for Assembly districts; pg. 510f for assemblymen)
 Journal of the Senate (92nd Session) (1869)
 Journal of the Assembly (92nd Session) (1869; Vol. I)
 Journal of the Assembly (92nd Session) (1869; Vol. II)

092
1869 in New York (state)
1869 U.S. legislative sessions